Gehri Buttar is a normal sized village in the Bathinda district of Eastern Punjab (India). The villagers belongs to the Buttar clan of the Jatts.

Geography

Gehri Buttar is centered (approx.) at, on the National Highway 64, only 16.2 km from Bathinda city. Phullo Mithi (4.2 km) and Sangat (4.2 km) are the nearby villages.

Demographics

In 2001, the village had the total population of 3,485 with 588 households, 1,791 males and 1,694 females. Thus males constitutes 51.4% and females 48.6% of total population with the sex ratio of 945 females per thousand males.

Culture

The village is predominated by the Jatt people of Buttar community/clan, who all are Sikhs and follows Sikhism. The beautiful Gurudwara Sahib is the main religious site for worship.

Punjabi is the mother tongue as well as the official language of the village.

Economy

Agriculture is the main source of income. The villagers are government employees also. Some of the villagers have their own business in the nearby city or in the village, and the poor are mostly labourers.

References

Villages in Bathinda district